The women's triple jump event at the 2020 Summer Olympics took place between 30 July and 1 August 2021 at the Japan National Stadium.

The event was won by Yulimar Rojas of Venezuela: Her winning jump of 15.67 meters also broke the 26-year-old world record.

Summary
On the second jump of the competition, the overwhelming favorite, Yulimar Rojas opened equalling the third best jump of her career, 15.41 m, which was also the fourth best jump in history, and an Olympic record. Patrícia Mamona followed her with a personal best 14.91 m to move into silver position. Liadagmis Povea jumped 14.70 m to get into third position. In the second round, she was displaced by Ana Peleteiro who jumped 14.77 m. Rojas' third jump was spectacular, video estimation showed her landing close to a foot beyond the world record, the front of her feet crossing 16 metres, but it was a foul by 13.5 cm. With fouls on her first two attempts, Shanieka Ricketts barely made it into the next round, jumping 14.47 m on her third attempt. On her fourth attempt to start the round, she jumped 14.84 m to move into bronze medal position. Towards the end of the fourth round, Mamona made her second personal best, getting over 15 metres with a 15.01 m. Peleteiro jumped 14.87 m in the fifth round to take over the bronze position. The 2016 champion, Caterine Ibargüen, made it to the final but was eliminated after three jumps, finishing tenth.

On the final jump of the competition, with the gold medal already secured, Rojas jumped , improving on Inessa Kravets' 26-year-old world record by 17 centimeters (6.7 inches).

Background
This was the 7th appearance of the event, having appeared at every Summer Olympics since 1996.

Qualification

Approximately 35 athletes were expected to compete; the exact number was dependent on how many nations use universality places to enter athletes in addition to the 32 qualifying through distance or ranking (1 universality place was used in 2016).

A National Olympic Committee (NOC) could enter up to 3 qualified athletes in the women's triple jump event if all athletes meet the entry standard or qualify by ranking during the qualifying period. (The limit of 3 has been in place since the 1930 Olympic Congress.) The qualifying standard is 14.32 metres. This standard was "set for the sole purpose of qualifying athletes with exceptional performances unable to qualify through the World Athletics Rankings pathway." The world rankings, based on the average of the best five results for the athlete over the qualifying period and weighted by the importance of the meet, will then be used to qualify athletes until the cap of 32 is reached.

The qualifying period was originally from 1 May 2019 to 29 June 2020. Due to the COVID-19 pandemic, the period was suspended from 6 April 2020 to 30 November 2020, with the end date extended to 29 June 2021. The world rankings period start date was also changed from 1 May 2019 to 30 June 2020; athletes who had met the qualifying standard during that time were still qualified, but those using world rankings would not be able to count performances during that time. The qualifying distance standards could be obtained in various meets during the given period that have the approval of World Athletics. Both outdoor and indoor meets are eligible. The most recent Area Championships may be counted in the ranking, even if not during the qualifying period.

NOCs can also use their universality place—each NOC can enter one female athlete regardless of time if they had no female athletes meeting the entry standard for an athletics event—in the triple jump.

Competition format
The 2020 competition continued to use the two-round format with divided final introduced in 1936. The qualifying round gave each competitor three jumps to achieve the qualifying distance of 14.40 metres; if fewer than 12 women do so, the top 12 (including all those tied) will advance. The final provided each jumper with three jumps; the top eight jumpers received an additional three jumps for a total of six, with the best to count (qualifying round jumps are not considered for the final).

Records
Prior to this competition, the existing world, Olympic, and area records were as follows.

The following new world and Olympic records were set during this competition.

The following national records were established during the competition:

Schedule

All times are Japan Standard Time (UTC+9)

The women's triple jump took place over two separate days.

Results

Qualifying 
Qualification Rules: Qualifying performance 14.40 (Q) or at least 12 best performers (q) advance to the Final.

Final

References

Women's triple jump
2020
Women's events at the 2020 Summer Olympics
Olympics